Apno (in older sources also Apne) is a settlement in the Municipality of Cerklje na Gorenjskem in the Upper Carniola region of Slovenia.

Name
Apno was attested in historical sources as Calh in 1232, Chalch in 1300, and Kalich in 1426, among other spellings.

References

External links 

Apno on Geopedia

Populated places in the Municipality of Cerklje na Gorenjskem